is a 2008 Japanese film directed by Keisuke Yoshida. It was in the Narrative Feature Competition at the 2008 Hawaii International Film Festival.

References

External links
 

Films directed by Keisuke Yoshida
2008 films
2000s Japanese-language films
Films set in restaurants
2000s Japanese films